Berlin Ndebe-Nlome is a Cameroonian footballer. He played three matches in the Primeira Liga of Portugal for P. Ferreira in 2010.

Career
Whilst on trial at Portsmouth he became somewhat of an enigma around the club, playing in numerous pre-season friendlies with only his name known to players and fans and was eventually offered a contract at the club, finally receiving a work permit six weeks after signing.

Prior to signing for Portsmouth he was contracted to Belgian First Division club K.V.C. Westerlo. After his release from Portsmouth, Berlin signed for Crawley Town on a short-term deal from Portsmouth in November 2007, lasting less than a month before being allowed to move on.

In July 2009 he was offered a chance to impress on trial at Swindon Town F.C. and appeared in two pre-season friendlies before moving on. He went on to play in Portugal for P. Ferreira in 2010, although he only featured in three league matches before moving clubs again.

References

External links

1987 births
Living people
Cameroonian footballers
Association football forwards
Expatriate footballers in Thailand
Portsmouth F.C. players
Crawley Town F.C. players
CE Constància players
Berlin Ndebe-Nlome
National League (English football) players
Atlético Monzón players
Berlin Ndebe-Nlome